Ted Kennedy (Edward Moore Kennedy, 1932–2009) was a United States Senator from Massachusetts.

Edward Kennedy may also refer to:
Edward J. Kennedy (born 1951), American politician from Massachusetts
Edward Kennedy (journalist) (c. 1905–1963), journalist who first reported the German surrender in World War II
Edward Coverley Kennedy (1879–1939), Royal Navy sailor
Edward Dean Kennedy (1945–1992), American murderer executed in Florida
Edward M. Kennedy Jr. (born 1961), American businessman and son of U.S. Senator Ted Kennedy and Virginia Joan Bennett
Edward Kennedy (priest) (died 1864), Dean of Clonfert from 1850 to 1864
Edward Joseph Kennedy (1851–?), Irish nationalist politician, Member of Parliament for South Sligo
Edward Shirley Kennedy (1817–1898), English mountaineer
Edward Stewart Kennedy (1912–2009), historian of science
Eddie Kennedy (born 1960), Irish painter

See also
Ed Kennedy (disambiguation)
Ted Kennedy (disambiguation)